The 2022–23 season of the Ukrainian Football Championship is the 32nd season of Ukraine's top women's football league. Consisting of two tiers it is scheduled to start on 10 September 2022.

Due to the 2022 wide scale Russian invasion of Ukraine, several teams are not able to resume competitions including the reigning champions WFC Zhytlobud-1 Kharkiv.

Format
The format of competitions for the season changed again for both tiers, but not significantly. The league finally expanded to 12 teams as it planned earlier and adopted classical format with straight double round-robin tournament home and away for the top tier (Vyshcha Liha) with the last team is set to be relegated to the lower tier for the next season. The top two teams will qualify for the European competitions.

Vyshcha Liha teams

Team changes

Name changes
 On 10 September 2022, WFC Zhytlobud-2 Kharkiv has officially transformed into a women team of FC Vorskla Poltava.

Vyshcha Liha stadiums

Vyshcha Liha managers

Vyshcha Liha league table

Vyshcha Liha results

Statistics

Top scorers

References

External links
WFPL.ua
Women's Football.ua womensfootball.com.ua
АНДРІЙ ПАВЕЛКО: «ЦЬОГО РОКУ ВІДНОВИМО ЖІНОЧИЙ ЧЕМПІОНАТ УКРАЇНИ З ФУТБОЛУ». womensfootball.com.ua. 9 July 2022

2022-23
2022–23 in Ukrainian association football leagues
Sports events affected by the 2022 Russian invasion of Ukraine